Kay Ulanday Barrett is a published poet, performer, educator, food writer, cultural strategist, and transgender, gender non-conforming, and disability advocate based in New York and New Jersey, whose work has been showcased nationally and internationally. Their second book, More Than Organs (Sibling Rivalry Press, 2020) received a 2021 Stonewall Honor Book Award by the American Library Association and is a 2021 Lambda Literary Award for Transgender Literature Finalist. They are a 2020 James Baldwin Fellowship recipient, three-time Pushcart Prize Nominee, and two-time Best of the Net Nominee. Barrett's writing and performance centers on the experience of queer, transgender, people of color, mixed race people, Asian, and Filipino/a/x community. The focus of their artistic work navigates multiple systems of oppression in the context of the U.S.

They have received fellowships from MacDowell (2020), Lambda Literary (2017, 2018), VONA Voices (2018), and Macondo (2018). In 2018 they were Guest Faculty at the Poetry Foundation. They have featured and given keynotes at venues such as The U.N., Lincoln Center, Symphony Space, Brooklyn Museum, Hemispheric Institute, and the Chicago Historical Society.  They also have served on committees, organizations, and collectives in attempts to serve communities that desire self-determination such as Trans Justice Funding Project, Transgender Law Center, Sylvia Rivera Law Project, and more.

Their work and thoughts have been published in media such as Vogue Magazine, them.us, ColorLines, Bitch, POOR Magazine, Curve magazine, Al Jazeera English, NYLON, Vogue, The Rumpus, Frontier Poetry, The Advocate, The Huffington Post, and PBS News Hour. Their first poetry collection, When The Chant Comes was published by Topside Press in 2016. Their second book, More Than Organs was published by Sibling Rivalry Press in the March 2020.

Early life and education 
Ulanday Barrett was born in Mackinaw City, and grew up in a low-income and working class household, their father a merchant marine and mother a migrant domestic worker. Barrett identifies as Mixed Race - Filipinx and white american. Barrett began writing and poetry as a task to help their mother during her shifts cleaning motel rooms and other people's homes. After their parents' divorce, Barrett moved with their mother to Chicago, Il., where they lived in the Albany Park and Logan Square neighborhoods. Kay then attended undergraduate studies at DePaul University and studied Women's & Gender Studies along with Political Science with a minor in English.  Barrett's early work is informed by the '90s spoken word, community theater, hip-hop, and slam poetry movements that arose in Chicago among marginalized communities of that time. They frequented open-mics, poetry slams, and community theatre spaces as well as organized in POC and migrant solidarity networks as a means to create queer and people of color community that they desperately longed for.

Performance and speaking work 
Barrett has been performing poetry, spoken word, and interdisciplinary theatre professionally since 2004. Trained by community poets and theater artists, much of their work was centered in the practices of Theatre of The Oppressed and Popular Education as shown by ensemble residencies he attended by theHemispheric Institute, namely New World Theater and Asian Arts Initiative. Recent writing and poetry have centered on the praxis of disability justice, specifically elaborating on intersectionality of multiple communities including transgender people of color and the chronically ill and disabled community.

As a poet, spoken-word artist, performer and speaker, Barrett's work has cited in various articles/essays/academic writing and featured on stages nationally and internationally.  Venues include: Princeton University, University of Chicago, Swarthmore, Oberlin College, U Penn, Carleton College, Northwestern University, Barnard, NYU, Columbia University, University of California Los Angeles, University of California Berkeley, University of Michigan, Brown University, University of Washington, Duke University, The School of The Art Institute Chicago, Bowery Poetry Club, The Chicago Historical Society, Queens Museum, The Asian American Writers Workshop, The Green Mill, The Guild Literary Complex, The Black Repertory Theatre, The Loft Literary Complex, The Lincoln Center, and Brooklyn Museum, among others.  They have presented and served as a keynote speaker at conferences such as INCITE! Women of Color Against Violence, The Hip-Hop Theater Festival, Tucson Poetry Festival, INCITE! Women of Color Against Violence, The Allied Media Conference, and The Philadelphia Transgender Wellness Conference.

Dedicated to community-driven cultural and movement building work, they have served on committees, led workshops, and featured with many organizations dedicated to the self-determination of Transgender, People of Color, and Queer People of Color such as FIERCE, The Audre Lorde Project, The Transgender Law Project, The Philadelphia Transgender Health Project, Queers for Economic Justice, The Disability Justice Collective, Civil Liberties and Public Policy Conference (CLPP), The National Queer Asian Pacific-Islander Alliance, The Allied Media Conference, CultureStrike, and Northeast Queer Trans People of Color Conference (NEQTPOCC). They must recently were in an advisory committee for the Netflix documentary, Crip Camp.

Poetry 
Barrett is a 2x nominated Pushcart Prize poet and is the author of When The Chant Comes, published in 2016. A second poetry collection is slated to publish in 2020 by Sibling Rivalry Press, titled More Than Organs which awarded them a 2021 Lambda Literary Finalist Award and an ALA Barbara Gittings Stonewall Honor Book Award by the American Library Association.Their work has been widely anthologized and published in several sources including: The New York Times, VIDA Review, Bitch Magazine, The Lily, The Rumpus, Frontier Poetry, The Washington Post, Buzzfeed,  PBS News Hour; Trans Bodies, Trans Selves, The Advocate, Out Magazine, Them, and Third Woman Press to name a few.

Sharon Bridgforth, author of love conjure/blues and the Lambda Literary Award winning, the bull-jean stories, published by RedBone Press reviews Ulanday Barrett's work, stating: "I believe that Kay is an artist of merit. Kay is all heart. All in… We need Kay’s stories, Kay’s stellar art, Kay’s warrior vision."

Teaching 
Barrett has been an educator teaching poetry, spoken word, theatre, slam poetry, and cultural work at various high schools and youth arts organizations nationwide. Their latest endeavors include workshops that center experiences of intersectionality, social justice, disability and chronic illness, and martial arts. Universities and organizations alike seek their work to address issues of marginalized identities and cultural work as movement building strategy.

Honors and awards 
Barrett has received the following awards: 
ALA Barbara Gittings Stonewall Honor Book Award (2021, Poetry & Literature)
Lambda Literary Award Finalist (2021, Transgender Poetry)
MacDowell, Artist-In-Residence (2020 Poetry, Literature)
James Baldwin Fellowship (2020, MacDowell) 
Best of the Net Nominee, Split This Rock (2019) 
 Magazine, Guest Judge, Poetry (2019)
9 Transgender and Gender Nonconforming Writers You Should Know: VOGUE (2018)
The Leeway Foundation, Funding Panelist & Judge (2018)
Lambda Literary Review, Writer-In-Residence: Poetry (2018)
Pushcart Prize, Nomination: Poetry (2017)
Pushcart Prize, Nomination: Poetry (2016)
Trans 100, Curator (2014)
 18 Million Rising Filipino American History Month Hero (2013)
 Trans 100: 100 Most Amazing Transgender People in the U.S. (2013)
 Trans Justice Funding Panel (2013)
 Trans 100 Honoree (2013)
 QWOC Media Wire’s Top 5 LGBT People of Color POETS (2013)
 Transgender Leadership Summit Advisory Board (2012)
 Filipino American Historical Society Feature (2011)
 Campus PRIDE HOT List Artist (2009–2010)
 Crossroads Foundation Individual Activist Award (2005)
 Gwendolyn Brooks Open-Mic Award, Finalist (2005)
 The Windy City Times "30 Under 30" Award (2005)
 The Windy City Times PRIDE Poetry 1st Prize (2009)

References

External links 
Official website
"What racial, disability and LGBTQ justice have in common", PBS News Hour 
Trans Man of Color with a Disability, Kay Ulanday Barrett, Breaks It Down Poetically, Politically & Personally 

Year of birth missing (living people)
Living people
Transgender rights activists
DePaul University alumni
LGBT people from Michigan